Chancellor Park may refer to:

Chancellor Park, Essex, England, a housing development 
Chancellor Park, a locality in Sippy Downs, Queensland, Australia
the Kanzlerpark in Berlin